Negar-e Pain (also Romanized as Negar-e Pā’īn; also known as Nūvār-e Pā’īn) is a village in Jask Rural District, in the Central District of Jask County, Hormozgan Province, Iran. At the 2006 census, its population was 381, in 77 families.

References 

Populated places in Jask County